Ruset Peak is the peak rising to 1453 m in the southeast part of Petvar Heights, southeast Sentinel Range in Ellsworth Mountains, Antarctica, and overlooking Carey Glacier to the west, Divdyadovo Glacier to the north, and Rutford Ice Stream to the east.

The peak is named after the Bulgarian cartographer Aleksandar Ruset (1810–1861).

Location
US mapping in 1961, updated in 1988.

Maps
 Vinson Massif.  Scale 1:250 000 topographic map.  Reston, Virginia: US Geological Survey, 1988.
 Antarctic Digital Database (ADD). Scale 1:250000 topographic map of Antarctica. Scientific Committee on Antarctic Research (SCAR). Since 1993, regularly updated.

Notes

References
 Ruset Peak. SCAR Composite Antarctic Gazetteer.
 Bulgarian Antarctic Gazetteer. Antarctic Place-names Commission. (details in Bulgarian, basic data in English)

External links
 Ruset Peak. Copernix satellite image

Ellsworth Mountains
Mountains of Ellsworth Land
Bulgaria and the Antarctic